Glam.com (formerly Mode Media, Inc. Project Y, Glam Media) was a digital lifestyle media company where content was produced by anyone but reviewed by professional editors prior to publishing. In 2013, Mode Media had a valuation of about $1 billion as the company prepped for an IPO. In 2015, Mode Media had grown to over $100 million in revenue, primarily from providing native content, branded video and digital advertising to large brands but had over $100 million in expenses.

On 15 September 2016, Mode Media abruptly shut down its operations.

In 2022, Glam was acquired by Static Media, a media company based in Indianapolis, IN.

History
Mode Media was founded as Project Y, Inc. in 2003 by Ernie Cicogna, Fernando Ruarte, Vic Zauderer, Dianna Mullins, Raj Narayan, Rebecca Bogle Arora, Susan Kare, Emmanuel Job and Samir Arora. The company originally was founded as a website to offer fashion and beauty content and blog content. The company launched Glam.com in September 2005 at Fashion Week in New York.

As the company grew, it diversified its focus from exclusively targeting a female audience. The company owned and operated Mode.com across 20 lifestyle categories and Channels: Glam (Women Style, Fashion, Beauty), Brash (Men's Lifestyle), Bliss (Health & Wellness), Tend (Parenting), Foodie (Food Recipes and Restaurants) and Entertainment, Music and Video. In June, 2007, Mode Media became the #1 women's web property in the US as reported by comScore.
In September, 2007, Mode Media launched its first discovery product "Glam Curator" and started to popularize the term "curation" as a new way of filtering content in the social web.
In January 2009 Mode acquired Personiva Inc, along with this Glam India Pvt. Ltd. a 100% subsidiary India company was created. 
Glam India created Glam Adapt, the Ad serving engine for Mode Media previously known as Glam Media.

In September 2011, Mode acquired Ning, a social media platform that allowed users to create custom social networks. In 2014, Glam Media was renamed to Mode Media. In 2014, Mode Media launched Mode Studios, to create original video series, branded entertainment and digital films in New York, San Francisco and Los Angeles. In 2015, Mode Media launched Mode Video streaming platform 

In total, the company raised approximately $225 million from silicon valley venture firms Accel, DFJ, Walden, Information Capital and investors Burda and Dentsu. After abruptly ceasing operations in September 2016, operations of its Ning division passed to a New York-based company, Cyndx. Mode Media did not file for bankruptcy protection.

References

Companies based in San Mateo County, California
Online advertising services and affiliate networks
Mass media companies established in 2003
Online companies of the United States
Privately held companies based in California